Wyo or WYO may refer to:

 Wyoming, a state in USA
 Wyo, California, a community in Glenn County, California
 Wessex Youth Orchestra, an orchestra in Poole, England
 Williamsburg Youth Orchestra, an orchestra in Williamsburg, Virginia
 World Youth Organization, a non-profit organization in Chennai, India
 WYO, a candidate phylum of bacteria
 José Miguel Monzón aka El Gran Wyoming, a Spanish humorist